Dahlia Salah El-Din (born 31 May 2001) is a Gibraltarian footballer who plays as a defender for Queens Park Rangers.

Career

As a youth player, Salah joined the youth academy of Spanish side Balón Linense. In 2020 she joined the futsal side of Gibraltar Wave, before joining Europa football team for the end of the 2020–21 season. In summer 2021, she signed for Queens Park Rangers in England, initially playing for their B team.

References

External links
 Dahlia Salah at UEFA.com

Living people
Gibraltarian women's footballers
Women's association football defenders
Gibraltar women's international footballers
2001 births
Women's futsal players
Expatriate women's footballers in England
Gibraltarian expatriate footballers
Expatriate women's footballers in Spain
Gibraltarian expatriate sportspeople in England
Gibraltarian expatriate sportspeople in Spain